Apamea unita is a moth of the family Noctuidae. It is found in North America from Alberta south to Arizona.

External links
Image

Apamea (moth)
Moths of North America
Moths described in 1904